Isshin is a Japanese word which may refer to:

Martial arts
Isshin-ryū, a modern style of karate
Isshin-ryu kusarigamajutsu, Japanese martial art using the chain and scythe weapon called kusarigama

Individuals
Isshin Chiba (born 1968), a voice actor who currently works for Arts Vision
Isshin Kurosaki, a fictional character in the popular anime and manga series Bleach created by Tite Kubo